St Leonard's Tower may refer to a number of buildings.

St Leonard's Tower, Newton Abbot, Devon.
St Leonard's Tower, West Malling, Kent